Bicske is a district in north-eastern part of Fejér County. Bicske is also the name of the town where the district seat is found. The district is located in the Central Transdanubia Statistical Region.

Geography 
Bicske District borders with Oroszlány District and Tatabánya District (Komárom-Esztergom County) to the north, Budakeszi District (Pest County) to the east, Martonvásár District, Gárdony District and Székesfehérvár District to the south, Mór District to the west. The number of the inhabited places in Bicske District is 15.

Municipalities 
The district has 2 towns, 1 large village and 12 villages.
(ordered by population, as of 1 January 2012)

The bolded municipalities are cities, italics municipality is large village.

See also
List of cities and towns in Hungary

References

External links
 Postal codes of the Bicske District

Districts in Fejér County